This is a list of international schools in Beijing

List of schools
 Australian International School Beijing
 Canadian International School of Beijing
 Lycée Français International Charles de Gaulle de Pékin
 Deutsche Botschaftsschule Peking
 Japanese School of Beijing
 Korean International School in Beijing
 Beijing Korean School (北京大韩学校)
 Pakistan Embassy College Beijing
 Russian Embassy School in Beijing
 British School of Beijing, Sanlitun
 British School of Beijing, Shunyi
 Dulwich College Beijing
 Harrow International School Beijing
 Nord Anglia School Beijing, Fangshan
 Beijing Saint Paul American School
 International School of Beijing
 Beanstalk International Bilingual School
 Beijing BISS International School
 Beijing Concord College of Sino-Canada
 Beijing City International School
 Beijing Haidian International School
 Beijing Huijia Private School
 Beijing International Bilingual Academy
 Beijing Kinglong International School
 Beijing Royal School
 Beijing Shuren Ribet Private School (American high school program)
 Beijing World Youth Academy
 Beijing Zhongguancun International School
 Hope International School
 Pennon Foreign Language School, Beijing
 The International School of Collaborative Learning
 Keystone Academy
 National Institute of Technology
 Springboard International Bilingual School
 Tsinghua International School
 Western Academy of Beijing
 Yang Guang Qing School of Beijing
 Yew Chung International School of Beijing
 Yew Wah International Education School of Beijing

Closed:
 Swedish School Beijing
 Beijing Rego British School

Lists of schools in Beijing
Beijing